Events from the year 2001 in Scotland.

Incumbents 

First Minister and Keeper of the Great Seal – Henry McLeish (until 8 November 2001), Jack McConnell (from 27 November 2001)
 Secretary of State for Scotland – John Reid until 25 January; then Helen Liddell

Law officers 
 Lord Advocate – Lord Boyd of Duncansby
 Solicitor General for Scotland – Neil Davidson; then Elish Angiolini
 Advocate General for Scotland – Lynda Clark

Judiciary 
 Lord President of the Court of Session and Lord Justice General – Lord Rodger of Earlsferry until 13 November; then Lord Cullen of Whitekirk
 Lord Justice Clerk – Lord Cullen, then Lord Gill
 Chairman of the Scottish Land Court – Lord McGhie

Events 
 31 January – the Scottish Court in the Netherlands convicts a Libyan and acquits another for their part in the bombing of Pan Am Flight 103 which crashed in Lockerbie in 1988. Lamin Khalifah Fhimah (aged 44) is cleared, but Abdelbaset al-Megrahi is found guilty and sentenced to life imprisonment (which will take place in Scotland) with a recommended minimum term of twenty years. Megrahi was released from prison on compassionate grounds in 2009; as doctors reported he had terminal prostate cancer, and he died on 20 May 2012, aged sixty.
 March – first natural gas production from the Elgin–Franklin fields in the North Sea.
 26 May – the Forth and Clyde Canal reopens throughout for leisure purposes (12 June officially).
 7 June – The UK general election results in the Labour Party winning 56 of Scotland's 72 seats, with the Liberal Democrats winning ten, the Scottish National Party winning five and the Conservatives gaining one.
 17 June – Cardinal Winning, head of the Roman Catholic church in Scotland, dies of a heart attack aged 76.
 21 June – Glasgow Science Centre opens to visitors.
 24 June – suicide of Nicola Ann Raphael in Glasgow following bullying. She was fifteen years old.
 14 July – Eriskay is linked to South Uist by causeway.
 10 September – the Bank of Scotland and the Halifax merge to form HBOS plc.
 October – Glasgow Tower first opens to public.
 6 November – the Protection from Abuse (Scotland) Act 2001 receives Royal Assent.
 13 December – New Lanark is designated as a World Heritage Site.
 23 December – the Cairngorm Mountain Railway opens.
 26 December – English-born author J. K. Rowling marries at the country house of Killiechassie which she purchased a month earlier.
 Full date unknown:
 Wilderness Scotland tour operator is founded.

Births 

 17 May – Anna Shackley, cyclist

Deaths 
 27 January – Robert Alexander Rankin, mathematician (born 1915)
 1 February – Jack Milroy, comedian and one half of Francie and Josie (born 1915)
 12 June – Thomas Wilson, classical composer (born 1927 in the United States)
 31 October – Angus MacVicar, writer (born 1908)
 15 November – Megan Boyd, fly tyer (born 1915 in England)

The arts
 Summer – Channel Six Dundee, a Restricted Service Licence television station, begins its 1-year operation.
 Anne Donovan's collection Hieroglyphics and Other Stories is published.
 Pop rock group Speedway formed by Glaswegians Jill Jackson (vocals) and Jim Duguid (drums).

See also 
 2001 in England
 2001 in Northern Ireland
 2001 in Wales

References 

 
Years of the 21st century in Scotland
2000s in Scotland